"Prophet (Better Watch It)" is the debut single released by British hip hop duo Rizzle Kicks, from their debut studio album, Stereo Typical. The single was released on 14 May 2011, in the United Kingdom. A music video to accompany the release was uploaded to YouTube on 2 April 2011, at a total length of three minutes and forty-nine seconds. It features the pair performing in a trance-like state whilst on a beach. The duo performed the song live for the first time on T4 on 2 June 2011. The single was a commercial flop, and as such, "Down with the Trumpets" is widely regarded as the group's debut and breakthrough single.

Track listing

Charts

Release history

References

2011 songs
2011 debut singles
Island Records singles
Rizzle Kicks songs